This is a list of Malaysian films produced and released in 2000. Most of the film are produced in the Malay language.

2000

January – March

April – June

July – September

October – December

Unreleased

See also
2000 in Malaysia

References

External links
Malaysian film at the Internet Movie Database
Malaysian Feature Films Finas
Cinema Online Malaysia

Malaysia
2000
2000 in Malaysia